Abdar (also Romanized as Ābdar) is a village in Siyah Banuiyeh Rural District, in the Central District of Rabor County, Kerman Province, Iran. At the 2006 census, its population was 16, in 4 families.

References 

Populated places in Rabor County